Merahna is a district in Souk Ahras Province, Algeria. It was named after its capital, Merahna.

Municipalities
The district is further divided into 3 municipalities:
Merahna
Ouillen 
Sidi Fredj 

Districts of Souk Ahras Province